Barium nitrate is the inorganic compound with the chemical formula Ba(NO3)2.  It, like most barium salts, is colorless, toxic, and water-soluble.  It burns with a green flame and is an oxidizer; the compound is commonly used in pyrotechnics.

Manufacture, occurrence, and reactions
Barium nitrate is manufactured by two processes that start with the main source material for barium, the carbonate. The first involves dissolving barium carbonate in nitric acid, allowing any iron impurities to precipitate, then filtered, evaporated, and crystallized. The second requires combining barium sulfide with nitric acid.

It occurs naturally as the very rare mineral nitrobarite.

At elevated temperatures, barium nitrate decomposes to barium oxide:
 2Ba(NO3)2 → 2BaO + 4NO2 + O2

Applications
Barium nitrate is used in the production of BaO-containing materials.

Military
Although no longer produced, Baratol is an explosive composed of barium nitrate, TNT and binder; the high density of barium nitrate results in baratol being quite dense as well.  Barium nitrate mixed with aluminium powder, a formula for flash powder, is highly explosive. It is mixed with thermite to form Thermate-TH3, used in military thermite grenades. Barium nitrate was also a primary ingredient in the "SR 365" incendiary charge used by the British in the De Wilde incendiary ammunition with which they armed their interceptor fighters, such as the Hawker Hurricane and Supermarine Spitfire, during the Battle of Britain.  It is also used in the manufacturing process of barium oxide, the vacuum tube industry and for green fire in pyrotechnics.

Safety

Like all soluble barium compounds, barium nitrate is toxic by ingestion or inhalation.

Solutions of sulfate salts such as Epsom salts or sodium sulfate may be given as first aid for barium poisoning, as they precipitate the barium as the insoluble (and non-toxic) barium sulfate.

Inhalation may also cause irritation to the respiratory tract.

While skin or eye contact is less harmful than ingestion or inhalation, it can still result in irritation, itching, redness, and pain.

The Occupational Safety and Health Administration and the National Institute for Occupational Safety and Health have set occupational exposure limits at 0.5 mg/m3 over an eight-hour time-weighted average.

References

Barium compounds
Nitrates
Nitrate minerals
Pyrotechnic oxidizers
Pyrotechnic colorants
Oxidizing agents